List of Bahamian popular musicians who have recorded music or have some public standing.

 Avvy – Inagua, Bahamas recording artist
Baha Men
 Sebastian Bach – Canadian heavy metal singer, born in Freeport, Bahamas
 Ronnie Butler
 Exuma
 "King" Eric Gibson - (ca. 1934, 2013) calypso music
 Blake Alphonso Higgs Goombay, Calypso music
 Johnny Kemp Bahamian singer, later Harlem, NYC
 Angelique Sabrina
 Joseph Spence
 André Toussaint – Haitian émigré singer/guitarist, performed and recorded in Nassau from early 1950s to 1981
 T-Connection

Musicians

Bahamian